Ṭa is a consonant of Indic abugidas. It is derived from the early "Ashoka" Brahmi letter  after having gone through the Gupta letter . As with the other retroflex consonants, ṭa is absent from most scripts not used for a language of India.

Āryabhaṭa numeration

Aryabhata used Devanagari letters for numbers, very similar to the Greek numerals, even after the invention of Indian numerals. The values of the different forms of ट are: 
ट  = 11 (११)
टि  = 1,100 (१ १००)
टु  = 110,000 (१ १० ०००)
टृ  = 11,000,000 (१ १० ०० ०००)
टॢ  = 1,100,000,000 (१ १० ०० ०० ०००)
टे  = 11 (११×१०१०)
टै  = 11 (११×१०१२)
टो  = 11 (११×१०१४)
टौ  = 11 (११×१०१६)

Historic Tta
There are three different general early historic scripts - Brahmi and its variants, Kharoṣṭhī, and Tocharian, the so-called slanting Brahmi. Tta as found in standard Brahmi,  was a simple geometric shape, with variations toward more flowing forms by the Gupta . The Tocharian Tta  did not have an alternate Fremdzeichen form. The third form of tta, in Kharoshthi was probably derived from Aramaic separately from the Brahmi letter.

Brahmi Tta
The Brahmi letter , Tta, is probably derived from the altered Aramaic Teth , and is thus related to the modern Greek Theta. Several identifiable styles of writing the Brahmi Tta can be found, most associated with a specific set of inscriptions from an artifact or diverse records from an historic period. As the earliest and most geometric style of Brahmi, the letters found on the Edicts of Ashoka and other records from around that time are normally the reference form for Brahmi letters, with vowel marks not attested until later forms of Brahmi back-formed to match the geometric writing style.

Tocharian Tta
The Tocharian letter  is derived from the Brahmi , but does not have an alternate Fremdzeichen form.

Kharoṣṭhī Tta
The Kharoṣṭhī letter  is generally accepted as being derived from the altered Aramaic Teth , and is thus related to Theta, in addition to the Brahmi Tta.

Devanagari script

Ṭa (ट) is the eleventh consonant of the Devanagari abugida.  It ultimately arose from the Brahmi letter , after having gone through the Gupta letter . Letters that derive from it are the Gujarati letter ટ, and the Modi letter 𑘘.

Devanagari-using Languages
Like all Indic scripts, Devanagari uses vowel marks attached to the base consonant to override the inherent /ə/ vowel:

Conjuncts with ट
Devanagari exhibits conjunct ligatures, as is common in Indic scripts. In modern Devanagari texts, most conjuncts are formed by reducing the letter shape to fit tightly to the following letter, usually by dropping a character's vertical stem, sometimes referred to as a "half form". Some conjunct clusters are always represented by a true ligature, instead of a shape that can be broken into constituent independent letters. Vertically stacked conjuncts are ubiquitous in older texts, while only a few are still used routinely in modern Devanagari texts. Lacking a vertical stem to drop for making a half form, Ṭa either forms a stacked conjunct/ligature, or uses its full form with Virama. The use of ligatures and vertical conjuncts may vary across languages using the Devanagari script, with Marathi in particular avoiding their use where other languages would use them.

Ligature conjuncts of ट
True ligatures are quite rare in Indic scripts. The most common ligated conjuncts in Devanagari are in the form of a slight mutation to fit in context or as a consistent variant form appended to the adjacent characters. Those variants include Na and the Repha and Rakar forms of Ra. Nepali and Marathi texts use the "eyelash" Ra half form  for an initial "R" instead of repha.
 Repha र্ (r) + ट (ṭa) gives the ligature rṭa: 

 Eyelash र্ (r) + ट (ṭa) gives the ligature rṭa:

 ट্ (ṭ) + rakar र (ra) gives the ligature ṭra:

 प্ (p) + ट (ṭa) gives the ligature pṭa:

 ष্ (ṣ) + ट (ṭa) gives the ligature ṣṭa:

 Repha र্ (r) + ष্ (ṣ) + ट্ (ṭ) + rakar र (ra) gives the ligature rṣṭra:

 ष্ (ṣ) + ट্ (ṭ) + व (va) gives the ligature ṣṭva:

Stacked conjuncts of ट
Vertically stacked ligatures are the most common conjunct forms found in Devanagari text. Although the constituent characters may need to be stretched and moved slightly in order to stack neatly, stacked conjuncts can be broken down into recognizable base letters, or a letter and an otherwise standard ligature.
 छ্ (ch) + ट (ṭa) gives the ligature chṭa:

 ढ্ (ḍʱ) + ट (ṭa) gives the ligature ḍʱṭa:

 ड্ (ḍ) + ट (ṭa) gives the ligature ḍṭa:

 द্ (d) + ट (ṭa) gives the ligature dṭa:

 ङ্ (ŋ) + ट (ṭa) gives the ligature ŋṭa:

 ट্ (ṭ) + ब (ba) gives the ligature ṭba:

 ट্ (ṭ) + भ (bha) gives the ligature ṭbha:

 ट্ (ṭ) + च (ca) gives the ligature ṭca:

 ट্ (ṭ) + छ (cha) gives the ligature ṭcha:

 ट্ (ṭ) + द (da) gives the ligature ṭda:

 ट্ (ṭ) + ड (ḍa) gives the ligature ṭḍa:

 ट্ (ṭ) + ढ (ḍʱa) gives the ligature ṭḍʱa:

 ट্ (ṭ) + ध (dʱa) gives the ligature ṭdʱa:

 ट্ (ṭ) + ग (ga) gives the ligature ṭga:

 ट্ (ṭ) + घ (ɡʱa) gives the ligature ṭɡʱa:

 ट্ (ṭ) + ह (ha) gives the ligature ṭha:

 ठ্ (ṭh) + ट (ṭa) gives the ligature ṭhṭa:

 ट্ (ṭ) + ज (ja) gives the ligature ṭja:

 ट্ (ṭ) + झ (jha) gives the ligature ṭjha:

 ट্ (ṭ) + ज্ (j) + ञ (ña) gives the ligature ṭjña:

 ट্ (ṭ) + क (ka) gives the ligature ṭka:

 ट্ (ṭ) + ख (kha) gives the ligature ṭkha:

 ट্ (ṭ) + क্ (k) + ष (ṣa) gives the ligature ṭkṣa:

 ट্ (ṭ) + ल (la) gives the ligature ṭla:

 ट্ (ṭ) + ळ (ḷa) gives the ligature ṭḷa:

 ट্ (ṭ) + म (ma) gives the ligature ṭma:

 ट্ (ṭ) + न (na) gives the ligature ṭna:

 ट্ (ṭ) + ङ (ŋa) gives the ligature ṭŋa:

 ट্ (ṭ) + ण (ṇa) gives the ligature ṭṇa:

 ट্ (ṭ) + ञ (ña) gives the ligature ṭña:

 ट্ (ṭ) + प (pa) gives the ligature ṭpa:

 ट্ (ṭ) + फ (pha) gives the ligature ṭpha:

 ट্ (ṭ) + स (sa) gives the ligature ṭsa:

 ट্ (ṭ) + श (ʃa) gives the ligature ṭʃa:

 ट্ (ṭ) + ष (ṣa) gives the ligature ṭṣa:

 ट্ (ṭ) + त (ta) gives the ligature ṭta:

 ट্ (ṭ) + थ (tha) gives the ligature ṭtha:

 ट্ (ṭ) + ट (ṭa) gives the ligature ṭṭa:

 ट্ (ṭ) + ठ (ṭha) gives the ligature ṭṭha:

 ट্ (ṭ) + व (va) gives the ligature ṭva:

 ट্ (ṭ) + य (ya) gives the ligature ṭya:

Bengali script
The Bengali script ট is derived from the Siddhaṃ , and is marked by a similar horizontal head line, but less geometric shape, than its Devanagari counterpart, ट. The inherent vowel of Bengali consonant letters is /ɔ/, so the bare letter ট will sometimes be transliterated as "tto" instead of "tta". Adding okar, the "o" vowel mark, gives a reading of /t̳o/.
Like all Indic consonants, ট can be modified by marks to indicate another (or no) vowel than its inherent "a".

ট in Bengali-using languages
ট is used as a basic consonant character in all of the major Bengali script orthographies, including Bengali and Assamese.

Conjuncts with ট
Bengali ট exhibits conjunct ligatures, as is common in Indic scripts, and commonly shows both stacked and linear (horizontal) ligatures.
 ক্ (k) + ট (ṭa) gives the ligature kṭa:

 ক্ (k) + ট্ (ṭ) + র (ra) gives the ligature kṭra, with the ra phala suffix:

 ল্ (l) + ট (ṭa) gives the ligature lṭa:

 ণ্ (ṇ) + ট (ṭa) gives the ligature ṇṭa:

 ন্ (n) + ট (ṭa) gives the ligature nṭa:

 ন্ (n) + ট্ (ṭ) + র (ra) gives the ligature nṭra, with the ra phala suffix:

 প্ (p) + ট (ṭa) gives the ligature pṭa:

 র্ (r) + ট (ṭa) gives the ligature rṭa, with the repha prefix:

 ষ্ (ṣ) + ট (ṭa) gives the ligature ṣṭa:

 ষ্ (ṣ) + ট্ (ṭ) + র (ra) gives the ligature ṣṭra, with the ra phala suffix:

 ষ্ (ṣ) + ট্ (ṭ) + য (ya) gives the ligature ṣṭya, with the ya phala suffix:

 স্ (s) + ট (ṭa) gives the ligature sṭa:

 স্ (s) + ট্ (ṭ) + র (ra) gives the ligature sṭra, with the ra phala suffix:

 ট্ (ṭ) + ম (ma) gives the ligature ṭma:

 ট্ (ṭ) + র (ra) gives the ligature ṭra, with the ra phala suffix:

 ট্ (ṭ) + ট (ṭa) gives the ligature ṭṭa:

 ট্ (ṭ) + ব (va) gives the ligature ṭva, with the va phala suffix:

 ট্ (ṭ) + য (ya) gives the ligature ṭya, with the ya phala suffix:

Gujarati Ṭa

Ṭa (ટ) is the eleventh consonant of the Gujarati abugida. It is derived from the Devanagari Ṭa  with the top bar (shiro rekha) removed, and ultimately the Brahmi letter .

Gujarati-using Languages
The Gujarati script is used to write the Gujarati and Kutchi languages. Like all Indic scripts, Gujarati uses vowel marks attached to the base consonant to override the inherent /ə/ vowel:

Conjuncts with ટ
Gujarati ટ exhibits conjunct ligatures, much like its parent Devanagari Script. While most Gujarati conjuncts can only be formed by reducing the letter shape to create a "half form" that fits tightly to following letter, Ṭa does not have a half form. A few conjunct clusters can be represented by a true ligature, instead of a shape that can be broken into constituent independent letters, and vertically stacked conjuncts can also be found in Gujarati, although much less commonly than in Devanagari. Lacking a half form, Ṭa will normally use an explicit virama when forming conjuncts without a true ligature.
True ligatures are quite rare in Indic scripts. The most common ligated conjuncts in Gujarati are in the form of a slight mutation to fit in context or as a consistent variant form appended to the adjacent characters. Those variants include Na and the Repha and Rakar forms of Ra.
 ર્ (r) + ટ (ʈa)  gives the ligature RṬa:

 ટ્ (ʈ) + ર (ra)  gives the ligature ṬRa:

 ટ્ (ʈ) + ટ (ʈa)  gives the ligature ṬṬa:

 ટ્ (ʈ) + ઠ (ʈha)  gives the ligature ṬṬha:

 ટ્ (ʈ) + વ (va)  gives the ligature ṬVa:

Burmese script 
Ta T'lin Cheik (ဋ) is the eleventh letter of the Burmese script.

Thai script 
Do Chada (ฎ) and To Patak (ฏ) are the fourteenth and fifteenth letters of the Thai script. As with ta and pa, the Indic letter has been split into two letters to distinguish the originally preglottalised (and now voiced) sound from the voiceless sound.

Do chada 
Do chada falls under the middle class of Thai consonants. In IPA, do chada is pronounced as [d] at the beginning of a syllable and as [t̚] at the end of a syllable. The 20th letter of the alphabet, do dek (ด), is also named do and falls under the middle class of Thai consonants. Thai consonants do not form conjunct ligatures, and may use the pinthu—an explicit virama with a dot shape—to indicate bare consonants. In the acrophony of the Thai script, chada (ชฎา) means 'headdress'.   Do chada and to patak both correspond to the Devanagari character 'ट'.

To patak 
To patak falls under the middle class of Thai consonants. In IPA, to patak is pronounced as [t] at the beginning of a syllable and may not be used to close a syllable. The 21st letter of the alphabet, to tao (ต), is also named to and falls under the middle class of Thai consonants. Thai consonants do not form conjunct ligatures, and may use the pinthu—an explicit virama with a dot shape—to indicate bare consonants. In the acrophony of the Thai script, patak (ปฏัก) means '(cattle) goad'. Do chada and to patak both correspond to the Devanagari character 'ट'.

Javanese script

Telugu Ṭa

Ṭa (ట) is a consonant of the Telugu abugida. It ultimately arose from the Brahmi letter . It is closely related to the Kannada letter ಟ. Since it lacks the v-shaped headstroke common to most Telugu letters, X remains unaltered by most vowel matras, and its subjoined form is simply a smaller version of the normal letter shape.
Telugu conjuncts are created by reducing trailing letters to a subjoined form that appears below the initial consonant of the conjunct. Many subjoined forms are created by dropping their headline, with many extending the end of the stroke of the main letter body to form an extended tail reaching up to the right of the preceding consonant. This subjoining of trailing letters to create conjuncts is in contrast to the leading half forms of Devanagari and Bengali letters. Ligature conjuncts are not a feature in Telugu, with the only non-standard construction being an alternate subjoined form of Ṣa (borrowed from Kannada) in the KṢa conjunct.

Malayalam Ṭa

Ṭa (ട) is a consonant of the Malayalam abugida. It ultimately arose from the Brahmi letter , via the Grantha letter  Tta. Like in other Indic scripts, Malayalam consonants have the inherent vowel "a", and take one of several modifying vowel signs to represent syllables with another vowel or no vowel at all.

Conjuncts of ട
As is common in Indic scripts, Malayalam joins letters together to form conjunct consonant clusters. There are several ways in which conjuncts are formed in Malayalam texts: using a post-base form of a trailing consonant placed under the initial consonant of a conjunct, a combined ligature of two or more consonants joined together, a conjoining form that appears as a combining mark on the rest of the conjunct, the use of an explicit candrakkala mark to suppress the inherent "a" vowel, or a special consonant form called a "chillu" letter, representing a bare consonant without the inherent "a" vowel. Texts written with the modern reformed Malayalam orthography, put̪iya lipi, may favor more regular conjunct forms than older texts in paḻaya lipi, due to changes undertaken in the 1970s by the Government of Kerala.
 ക് (k) +  ട (ṭa)  gives the ligature kṭa:

 ട് (ṭ) +  ട (ṭa)  gives the ligature ṭṭa:

 ണ് (ṇ) +  ട (ṭa)  gives the ligature ṇṭa:

 ഷ് (ṣ) +  ട (ṭa)  gives the ligature ṣṭa:

Canadian Aboriginal Syllabics Te

ᑌ, ᑎ, ᑐ and ᑕ are the base characters "Te", "Ti", "To" and "Ta" in the Canadian Aboriginal Syllabics. The bare consonant ᑦ (T) is a small version of the A-series letter ᑕ, although the Western Cree letter ᐟ, derived from Pitman shorthand was the original bare consonant symbol for T. The character ᑌ is derived from a handwritten form of the Devanagari letter ट, without the headline or vertical stem, and the forms for different vowels are derived by rotation.
Unlike most writing systems without legacy computer encodings, complex Canadian syllabic letters are represented in Unicode with pre-composed characters, rather than with base characters and diacritical marks.

Odia Ṭa

Ṭa (ଟ) is a consonant of the Odia abugida. It ultimately arose from the Brahmi letter , via the Siddhaṃ letter  Tta. Like in other Indic scripts, Odia consonants have the inherent vowel "a", and take one of several modifying vowel signs to represent syllables with another vowel or no vowel at all.

Conjuncts of ଟ 
As is common in Indic scripts, Odia joins letters together to form conjunct consonant clusters. The most common conjunct formation is achieved by using a small subjoined form of trailing consonants. Most consonants' subjoined forms are identical to the full form, just reduced in size, although a few drop the curved headline or have a subjoined form not directly related to the full form of the consonant. The second type of conjunct formation is through pure ligatures, where the constituent consonants are written together in a single graphic form. This ligature may be recognizable as being a combination of two characters or it can have a conjunct ligature unrelated to its constituent characters.
 ଟ୍ (ṭ) +  ଟ (ṭa)  gives the ligature ṭṭa:

Comparison of Ṭa
The various Indic scripts are generally related to each other through adaptation and borrowing, and as such the glyphs for cognate letters, including Ṭa, are related as well.

Character encodings of Ṭa
Most Indic scripts are encoded in the Unicode Standard, and as such the letter Ṭa in those scripts can be represented in plain text with unique codepoint. Ṭa from several modern-use scripts can also be found in legacy encodings, such as ISCII.

References

 Conjuncts are identified by IAST transliteration, except aspirated consonants are indicated with a superscript "h" to distinguish from an unaspirated cononant + Ha, and the use of the IPA "ŋ" and "ʃ" instead of the less dinstinctive "ṅ" and "ś".

Further reading
 Kurt Elfering: Die Mathematik des Aryabhata I. Text, Übersetzung aus dem Sanskrit und Kommentar. Wilhelm Fink Verlag, München, 1975, 
 Georges Ifrah: The Universal History of Numbers. From Prehistory to the Invention of the Computer. John Wiley & Sons, New York, 2000, .
 B. L. van der Waerden: Erwachende Wissenschaft. Ägyptische, babylonische und griechische Mathematik. Birkhäuser-Verlag, Basel Stuttgart, 1966, 
 
 

Indic letters